{{DISPLAYTITLE:C9H11N5O3}}
The molecular formula C9H11N5O3 (molar mass: 237.21 g/mol, exact mass: 237.0862 u) may refer to: 

 Biopterin
 Dyspropterin
 Sepiapterin 

Molecular formulas